Kakumia otlauga, the western kakumia, is a butterfly in the family Lycaenidae. It is found in Guinea, Sierra Leone, Liberia, Ivory Coast, Ghana, Nigeria (south and the Cross River loop), Cameroon, Gabon and possibly western Uganda. The habitat consists of forests.

References

Butterflies described in 1890
Poritiinae
Butterflies of Africa